Pócsa (German: Bootsch) is a village and municipality (Hungarian: község) in Baranya county, Hungary. Residents are Magyars, with minority of Germans.
Until the end of World War II, the majority of the Inhabitants was Danube Swabians, also called locally as Stifolder, because there Ancestors once came at the 17th century and 18th century from Fulda (district). Mostly of the former German Settlers was expelled to Allied-occupied Germany and Allied-occupied Austria in 1945–1948, about the Potsdam Agreement.
Only a few Germans of Hungary live there, the majority today are the descendants of Hungarians from the Czechoslovak–Hungarian population exchange. They got the houses of the former Danube Swabians Inhabitants.

Geography 
Pócsa is located in east central Baranya County, about 5 kilometers north of Villány, 7 kilometers from Bóly and 25 kilometers from Pécs. The municipality lies within the Southern Transdanubia Region of Hungary. It previously was part of the Mohács Subregion but during the creation of districts in 2013, it became part of Bóly District.

Demographics 
During the census of 2011, the population was 178. The vast majority of the population claimed Hungarian ethnicity (95%), though 30.3% also claimed German ethnicity and the municipality has a German local minority self-government. Other ethnicities included Roma (1.6%), Croatian (1.1%) and Romanian (1.1%). 3.8% did not wish to answer. In terms of religious practice, 71.4% reported to be Roman Catholic, 4.9% Calvinist, 0.5% Lutheran, 5.4% of no religious affiliation and 17.8% did not wish to answer.

Transport 
The closest railway station is in Villány, 5 kilometers to the south.

References 

Baranya (region)
History of Baranya (region)
Populated places in Baranya County